Vyshyvanka (  or) is a casual name for the embroidered shirt in Ukrainian and Belarusian national costumes. Ukrainian vyshyvanka is distinguished by local embroidery features specific to Ukrainian embroidery.

Etymology
The word "vyshyvanka" itself is from вишива́ти (vyšyváti, "to embroider") and -а́нка (-ánka), which means "something that is embroidered".

In English translations of Ukrainian texts, the word "vyshyvanka" is a loanword. The same way as the kilt speaks about its Scottish origin, or moccasins attribute to Native American heritage, vyshyvanka proudly defines Ukrainian people.

Ukrainian vyshyvankas

Embroidery

The embroidery is a fundamental element of the Ukrainian folk costume in both sexes. Ukrainian vyshyvanka is distinguished by local embroidery features specific to Ukrainian embroidery: 

In Ukrainian embroidery, black, red, and white colours are basic, and yellow, blue, and green are supplementary.

On the territory of Ukraine, embroidery existed already in the 5th century B.C, and was a creation of Scythian fine art. Ukraine is famous throughout the world for its highly artistic embroidery. It is important for the embroiderer today to use folk art as a source without altering stitches or colours because every change devalues a piece of embroidery and distorts it.

Artistic influence

Other national dresses
The costume of Ukrainian settlers since the 17th century had most certainly influenced southern Russian dress, so the sleeves of the chemises of girls and young women were decorated with geometric embroidery in black or red.

High fashion
During Paris Fashion Week 2015, Ukrainian fashion designer Vita Kin was featured in Vogue magazine and Harper's Bazaar for introducing vyshyvanky as modern Bohemian style designs that attracted fashion icons like Anna Dello Russo, Miroslava Duma, and Leandra Medine. The designer transformed vyshyvanka shirt into a more modern version. She kept the traditional form, but changed the embroidery borrowing some elements from Ukrainian rushnyk and home textile.

In its US May issue Vogue wrote that the vyshyvanka has "made waves far past the Eastern European country". The Times of London declared it "this summer's [2016] most sought-after item of clothing", soon following was the New York Times who advised readers to stock up on this "top of summer" fashion. French actress Melanie Thierry wore a vyshyvanka at the 2016 Cannes Film Festival. Queen Máxima of the Netherlands wore a vyshyvanka dress when visiting the 2016 Summer Olympics.

Meaning

Traditional beliefs
Vyshyvanka is used as a talisman to protect the person wearing it and to tell a story. A geometric pattern woven in the past by adding red or black threads into the light thread was later imitated by embroidery, and believed to have the power to protect a person from all harm. There is a saying in Ukrainian "Народився у вишиванці" which is translated as somebody was born wearing vyshyvanka. It is used to emphasize someone's luck and ability to survive in any situation.

Patriotism

Archduke Wilhelm of Austria was a Ukrainian patriot who preferred wearing the vyshyvanka and was therefore known in Ukrainian as Vasyl Vyshyvanyi (Basil the Embroidered). The Vyshyvanoho Square was named in his honour in the city of Lviv.

Vyshyvanka and other national symbols became extremely popular in Ukraine following Euromaidan, including in LGBT+ communities signalling their belonging to the nation.

Vyshyvanka is not present in the traditional Russian women's costume with the sarafan consisting of a long full skirt hanging just below the arms with straps or an extremely abbreviated bodice that secures it over the shoulders.

Celebration
Vyshyvanka Day originated in 2006 at Chernivtsi National University by its student Lesia Voroniuk and gradually became international as the International Day of Vyshyvanka. It is celebrated on the third Thursday of May. It is intended to unite all Ukrainians over the world, regardless of religion, language they speak or their place of residence. It is a flash mob holiday, which is not attached to any public holiday or feast day. On this day, many Ukrainians wear vyshyvanky to demonstrate commitment to the idea of national identity and unity and to show their patriotism. State officials, including municipal, court, and the government officials and the head of the state, may take part in celebration.

In 2018, the Appeal Instance of the Ministry of Economic Development and Trade of Ukraine conducted a research and came to the following conclusions:

Belarusian vyshyvanka

The vyshyvanka is regarded as a national symbol by members of the government and opposition alike, with Minister of Foreign Affairs Vladimir Makei saying in 2017, "The patterns used to embroider these shirts have never promoted violence or evil. Quite the contrary, they promote goodness and peacefulness. They reflect the mentality of the Belarusian people, our spirit." Unlike in Ukraine, where the embroidery's features are primarily determined by region, the Belarusian vyshyvanka is embroidered according to national and personal history, and is also often used to record information. It is also commonly claimed that vyshyvanky help to ward off evil spirits.

During the 2020–2021 Belarusian protests, the vyshyvanka became a symbol of the Belarusian opposition, as well as the Belarusian national identity in general. The online website Vyzhyvanka (from vyshyvanka and ) by Belarusian-Czech artist Rufina Bazlova was noted as a significant symbol of the protest movement.

Gallery

Ukrainian vyshyvanka

See also

 Ukrainian culture
 Ukrainian wreath
 Kosovorotka - Equivalent Russian men's shirt

References

External links

Ukrainian traditions
Embroidery
Ukrainian folk clothing
Folk costumes
Shirts
Ukrainian clothing
Belarusian clothing
Handicrafts
Ukrainian design
Textile arts of Ukraine
National symbols of Ukraine